The 1990 Maryland gubernatorial election was held on November 6, 1990. Incumbent Democrat William Donald Schaefer defeated Republican nominee William S. Shepard handily (59.76% to 40.23%).

, this was the last occasion that the following counties have voted Democratic in a gubernatorial election: Cecil, Calvert, Harford, St. Mary's, and Worcester.

Primary elections
Primary elections were held on September 11, 1990.

Democratic primary

Candidates
William Donald Schaefer, incumbent Governor
Frederick M. Grisser Jr., LaRouche Activist

Results

Republican primary

Candidates
William S. Shepard, diplomat
Ross Zimmerman Pierpont, perennial candidate

Results

General election

Candidates
William Donald Schaefer, Democratic
William S. Shepard, Republican

Results

References

1990
Maryland
Gubernatorial